Municipality of Podgorica (Montenegrin: Opština Podgorica / Општина Подгорица) is divided into 57 local communities (Montenegrin Latin: mjesne zajednice, singular: mjesna zajednica), bodies in which the citizens participate in making decisions about matters of relevance to the community in which they live.

In 2006, two city municipalities (Montenegrin Latin: gradske opštine, singular: gradska opština) were created within the municipality of Podgorica. The city municipality of Golubovci is self-governed in the matters assigned to it by the Capital City Law and the Podgorica City Charter.

Local communities within the municipality of Podgorica

Urban communities
Urban Local Communities within the municipality of Podgorica are subdivisions of urban area of Podgorica.

1. maj (1 May)
19. decembar (19 December)
Blok V
Blok VI 
Dahna
Donja Gorica (Lower Gorica)
Donji Kokoti
Drač
Gornja Gorica (Upper Gorica)
Ibričevina
Jedinstvo (Unity) 
Konik
Kruševac
Ljubović
Masline (Olives)
Međeđak 
Momišići
Murtovtina
Nova Varoš (New Town)
Novo Naselje Kruševac 
Pobrežje
Podgore 
Proleter 
Sadine 
Stara Varoš (Old Town)
Stara Zlatica 
Stari Aerodrom (Old Airport)
Tološi I
Tološi II
Vranići
Vrela Ribnička (Ribnica springs)
Zagorič
Zlatica

Rural communities
Rural Local Communities of Podgorica are subdivisions of the part of Municipality of Podgorica outside of city of Podgorica. The Urban Municipality of Golubovci is entirely made up of rural local communities.

Balabani – Gostilj 
Barutana (Gunpowder mill) 
Beri 
Bioče     
Botun 
Buronje 
Brskut 
Dajbabe         
Doljani 
Donja Zeta (Lower Zeta)    
Golubovci        
Goričani - Šušunje
Gornja Zeta (Upper Zeta) 
Gradac 
Hoti 
Komani 
Lijeva Rijeka (Left River) 
Liješnje 
Lješkopolje 
Mahala - Mojanovići
Mataguži
Nadno Liješnja 
Pelev Brijeg 
Rogami 
Stijena (The Rock) 
Trmanje 
Tuzi Ljevorečke 
Ubli 
Velje Brdo (Big Hill) 
Vranjina 
Vukovci - Ponari

City municipalities

City Municipality of Golubovci
City Municipality of Golubovci (Montenegrin: Gradska Opština Golubovci / Градска Општина Голубовци) is a subdivision the municipality of Podgorica, located in its southern part, and centered on the town of Golubovci, encompassing the southern and western part of Zeta Plain and borders Tuzi Municipality.

 City Municipality of Golubovci consists of following towns and villages:
Golubovci, Balabani, Berislavci, Bijelo Polje, Bistrica, Vukovci, Gostilj, Goričani, Kurilo, Mojanovići, Ponari, Šušunje, Mahala, Mataguži, Ljajkovići, Srpska, Botun and Mitrovići.

References

Geography of Podgorica
Subdivisions
Podgorica